The Arjuna Award, officially known as Arjuna Awards for Outstanding Performance in Sports and Games, is the second-highest sporting honour of India, the highest being the Major Dhyan Chand Khel Ratna Award. The award is named after Arjuna, one of the characters of the Sanskrit epic Mahabharata of ancient India. He is the main protagonist of the epic. He is considered one of the greatest warriors of ancient India after Rama and Parshurama. In Hinduism, he has been seen as a symbol of hard work, dedication and concentration. It is awarded annually by the Ministry of Youth Affairs and Sports. Before the introduction of the Major Dhyan Chand Khel Ratna in 1991–1992, the Arjuna award was the highest sporting honour of India. The nominations for the award are received from all government recognised National Sports Federations, the Indian Olympic Association, the Sports Authority of India (SAI), the Sports Promotion and Control Boards, the state and the union territory governments and the Major Dhyan Chandra Khel Ratna, Arjuna, Dhyan Chand and Dronacharya awardees of the previous years. The recipients are selected by a committee constituted by the Ministry and are honoured for their "good performance in the field of sports over a period of four years" at the international level and for having shown "qualities of leadership, sportsmanship and a sense of discipline."

Instituted in 1961 to honour the outstanding sportspersons of the country, the award over the years has undergone a number of expansions, reviews and rationalizations. The award was expanded to include all the recognised disciplines in 1977,introduced indigenous games and physically handicapped categories in 1995 and introduced a lifetime contribution category in 1995 leading to creation of a separate Dhyan Chand Award in 2002. The latest revision in 2018 stipulates that the award is given only to the disciplines included in the events like Olympic Games, Paralympic Games, Asian Games, Commonwealth Games, World Championship and World Cup along with Cricket, Indigenous Games, and Parasports. It also recommends giving only fifteen awards in a year, relaxing in case of excellent performance in major multi-sport events, team sports, across gender and giving away of at least one award to physically challenged category.

History 
Since the year 2001, the award is given only in disciplines falling under the following categories:
 Olympic Games / Asian Games / Commonwealth Games / World Cup / World Championship Disciplines and Cricket
 Indigenous Games
 Sports for the Physically Challenged

Lists of recipients

By year

By sport

Olympic sports

Non Olympic sports

Parasports

 Parasports

Explanatory notes

References

External links

Official website

Indian sports trophies and awards
 
Awards established in 1961
Ministry of Youth Affairs and Sports